Music in Mouth is the second studio album from Irish band Bell X1, released on 18 July 2003 in Ireland and on 21 July in the UK. It was produced by Jamie Cullum (the producer, not the popular jazz singer).

The album contains the song, "Eve, the Apple of My Eye".

The title of the album is taken from the poem "The Planters Daughter" by Irish poet Austin Clarke.

Track listing
All songs written by Brian Crosby, David Geraghty, Paul Noonan and Dominic Philips except where noted.

 "Snakes and Snakes"  – 4:00
 "Alphabet Soup"  – 4:56
 "Daybreak"  – 5:12
 "Eve, the Apple of My Eye"  – 5:37
 "Next To You"  – 3:59
 "West Of Her Spine"  – 3:23
 "Bound For Boston Hill"  – 4:52
 "Tongue" (Crosby, Geraghty, Noonan, Philips, Damien Rice) – 5:23
 "White Water Song"  – 2:42
 "In Every Sunflower"  – 5:53
 "I'll See Your Heart And I'll Raise You Mine"  – 5:09
 "Eve, the Apple of My Eye" (single version)  – 4:06

2003 albums
Bell X1 (band) albums